Rosdi Bin Talib (born 11 January 1976) is a Malaysian former international footballer. Rosdi plays mainly as a left-back but can also plays as a defensive midfielder.

Club career

Rosdi started his career in the early 1990s at Terengganu youth team before being promoted to the first team. Playing for Terengganu he won the Malaysia FA Cup in 2000. In December 2000, he extents his contract with the club for another season. Rosdi played several seasons with his hometown side before left for Pahang in 2003.

After signed with Pahang in 2003, Rosdi won the 2004 Malaysia Super League championship and 2006 Malaysia FA Cup.

In 2009 he returned to his hometown and played for Kuala Terengganu based club PBDKT T-Team FC. After four years stint with PBDKT T-Team FC, Rosdi later signed with Terengganu in 2014. He later announced his retirement after his contract with Terengganu ends in 2014.

In April 2014, Rosdi came back from retirement to join Penang side PBAPP FC.

International career
Rosdi has represented Malaysia national team since the 2000 AFC Asian Cup qualification. He helped Malaysia became the runners-up of the 2000 Merdeka Tournament and third-place finishers in the 2000 Tiger Cup. Rosdi has been appointed as the captain of the Malaysian national team in the 2004 Tiger Cup where Malaysia finished third. He was also selected to play for Malaysia in the 2007 AFC Asian Cup, playing the entire match. His last match for Malaysia was against Iran.

Managerial career
In January 2014, Rosdi has been appointed as the assistant coach of third-tier club based in Terengganu Hanelang.

Honours
Terengganu
Malaysia Cup: 2001
Pahang
Malaysia Super League: 2004
Malaysia
Merdeka Tournament runner-up: 2000
Tiger Cup third: 2000, 2004

References

External links
 

1976 births
Living people
Malaysian footballers
Malaysia international footballers
2007 AFC Asian Cup players
Sri Pahang FC players
Terengganu FC players
People from Terengganu
Terengganu F.C. II players
Malaysia Super League players
Association football fullbacks
Association football midfielders
Malaysian people of Malay descent